Gawn Grainger (born 12 October 1937) is a British actor, playwright and screenwriter.

Early life
Some sources indicate he was born in Glasgow, Scotland on 12 October 1937. He is the son of Charles Neil Grainger and his wife Elizabeth (née Gall). Educated at Westminster City School in Victoria, London, he later trained for the stage at the Italia Conti Academy of Theatre Arts.

Grainger made his first London appearance as a boy in 1950, when he played the Boy King in Ivor Novello's King's Rhapsody at the Palace Theatre.

Career
He began his professional career at the Dundee Rep in 1961, followed by two years at Ipswich, 1962–64. He joined Laurence Olivier's National Theatre at the Old Vic company in 1972.

Among his notable television credits are the Apostle Andrew in Son of Man by Dennis Potter (1969); the Earl of Kildare in The Shadow of the Tower (1972); George Stephenson in the Doctor Who serial The Mark of the Rani (1985) and Lesley Flux in Midsomer Murders episode The House in the Woods (2005). He was an occasional panelist on the syndicated, New York-based What's My Line? series in 1968, 1969 and 1970.

Writer
Grainger authored the following plays: Four to One (1976), Vamp Till Ready (1978), Lies in Plastic Smiles (1979) and Paradise Lost (1980). In the 1980s, he also wrote several scripts for Geoff McQueen 's BBC1 drama series Big Deal starring Ray Brooks.

Personal life
His second marriage was to the actress Janet Key in 1970. Together they had two children. Their marriage lasted until Key's death from cancer in July 1992. His third marriage is to American-British actress Zoë Wanamaker, to whom he has been married since November 1994.

Grainger was a close friend of Laurence Olivier and his family, and helped the actor write his second book On Acting (1986).

Donmar Warehouse 2012
From February to April 2012 Grainger performed as Mr Balance in The Recruiting Officer, the 1706 late Restoration Comedy by Irish playwright, George Farquhar. It was the highly acclaimed first production for incoming artistic director Josie Rourke at The Donmar Warehouse in London. As a result of the particular interest generated in Grainger's life over the course of the production, Mark Gatiss, his fellow cast member, instigated a Platform event which took place before the evening performance of The Recruiting Officer on 11 April.

During the discussion, Grainger confirmed some little known facts about his life and told anecdotes about his career over sixty years as both actor and playwright in the UK and US. Joking with Gatiss about some confusion around the date and place of his birth, he commented that he appeared to have been born twice, in 1937 in Glasgow and in 1940 in Northern Ireland. He admitted that the latter had been a twist on a then more romantic notion of theatrical heritage. It was at this point that Grainger also revealed that he learned that his biological father had in fact been his parents' lodger who later went on to marry his mother. He expressed gratitude to his father for bringing him along as a small boy to theatrical events which he humorously described and which had a positive effect on his imagination and determination to engage with performance. He began writing for the stage prior to his professional acting debut, having his first play performed at the age of twenty-one. Following a distinguished acting career, most particularly at the National Theatre in London, Grainger worked on writing projects in the 1980s whilst his children grew up. He returned to acting in the 1990s at the insistence of Harold Pinter, who, when asked by Grainger, "why should I return to acting?", replied, "because you owe it to yourself".

Theatre career
Stage debut as the Boy King in King's Rhapsody, Palace Theatre, 1950
Professional debut: Dundee Rep, 1961; Ipswich 1962–64; and Bristol Old Vic, 1964–66
Bristol Old Vic, parts included: Title role in Kean; Christy Mahon in The Playboy of the Western World, Romeo, Laertes in Hamlet and Claudio in Measure for Measure
Toured the world in the last three roles, making his New York debut as Romeo in Romeo and Juliet at the City Center Theatre, February 1967
Jimmy in There's a Girl in My Soup, Music Box, New York, October 1967
Cyril Bishop in The Giveaway, Garrick Theatre, London, April 1969
James Boswell in The Douglas Cause, Duke of York's, November 1971
McCue in The Front Page, National Theatre at the Old Vic, July 1972
Macduff in Macbeth, National Theatre, November 1972
Oronte in The Misanthrope, National Theatre, February 1973
Officer in The Bacchae, National Theatre, August 1973
Roberto in Saturday, Sunday, Monday, National Theatre, October 1973
Jeremy Haynes in The Party, National Theatre, December 1973
Stephen Lloyd in Next of Kin, National Theatre, May 1974
Figaro in The Marriage of Figaro (play), National Theatre, July 1974
Toured the US as Oronte in the NT production of The Misanthrope, 1975, appearing at the St James Theater NY, March 1975
Osric in Hamlet, National Theatre at the Old Vic, December 1975, and NT Lyttelton, March 1976
Took part in Tribute to a Lady, Old Vic, February 1976
Usumcasane in Tamburlaine the Great, NT Olivier, October 1976 and May 1977
Juggler in Force of Habit, NT, November 1976
Casca in Julius Caesar, NT, March 1977
Soldier in The Passion, NT, April 1977
To Those Born Later, NT, June 1977
Corporal Stoddard in The Plough and the Stars, NT, September 1977
Mr Dorilant in The Country Wife, NT, November 1977
Schoolmaster in Brand, NT, April 1978
Ajax in The Woman, NT, August 1978
Charles I in The World Turned Upside Down, NT, November 1978
Wesley in Has 'Washington' Legs?, NT, November 1978
Jack/Nick in The Long Voyage Home, NT, February 1979
George/General Heller in Dispatches, NT, June 1979
Doctor/Squire/Landlord/Rector in Lark Rise and Sir Timothy in Candleford, NT Cottesloe, October and November 1979
Jimmy Tomorrow in The Iceman Cometh, NT, 1980
Reverend Hale in The Crucible, NT at the Comedy Theatre, March 1981
Knight The Passion, NT international tour, 1981
Party Time and Mountain Language, Almeida Theatre, November 1991
No Man's Land, Almeida. November 1992; Comedy Theatre, February 1993
A Month in the Country, Albery, March 1994
Taking Sides, Minerva, Chichester, May 1995; Criterion, July 1995
Fool for Love, Donmar Warehouse, October 1996
Wishbones, Bush, June 1997
Mutabilitte, NT Cottesloe, November 1997
Garret Fitzmaurice in Give Me Your Answer Do, Hampstead, March 1998; Gramercy Theatre, NY, October 1999
Tales from Hollywood, Donmar Warehouse, May 2001
Sing Yer Heart Out for the Lads, NT Lyttelton Loft, May 2002; NT Cottesloe, April 2004
Absolutely (Perhaps), Wyndham's, October 2003
The Seagull, NT Lyttelton, June 2006
Frank in Amy's View, Garrick, November 2006
You Can't Take It With You, Southwark Playhouse, October 2007
Saint Matthew/Caliphas the Elder, The Last Days of Judas Iscariot, Almeida, April 2008
Robbie in "Really Old, Like Forty Five", The National Theatre, London, January 2010
Costa in "Onassis", Derby Theatre & Novello Theatre, 2010
A Woman Killed With Kindness, NT Lyttelton, July 2011
The Recruiting Officer, Donmar Warehouse, 2012
Don Juan's father in "Don Juan in Soho", Wyndham Theatre, 2017

References

External links

1937 births
British dramatists and playwrights
British male film actors
British male stage actors
Living people
British male television actors
Male actors from Glasgow
20th-century British male actors
21st-century British male actors
British male dramatists and playwrights